Pacolet is a town in Spartanburg County, South Carolina, United States. The population was 2,235 at the 2010 census.

History
Pacolet had its start in 1859 when the railroad was extended to that point. The name Pacolet may be derived from the Cherokee word meaning "horse", or it may be named after one Mr. Pacoley, a pioneer French settler.

Historic sites
The Marysville School, Mulberry Chapel Methodist Church, Nuckolls-Jefferies House, Pacolet Mill Office, Pacolet Mills Cloth Room and Warehouse, Pacolet Mills Historic District, and Pacolet Soapstone Quarries are listed on the National Register of Historic Places.

Geography

Demographics

2020 census

As of the 2020 United States census, there were 2,274 people, 957 households, and 590 families residing in the town.

2010 census
As of the census of 2010, there were 2,235 people, 962 households, and 625 families residing in the town. The population density was 750 people per square mile (290 km2). There were 962 housing units at an average density of 320.7 per square mile (124.9 km2). The racial makeup of the town was 75.7% White, 21.7% African American, 0.2% Native American, 1.2% Asian, 0.1% Native Hawaiian and Other Pacific Islander 0.1% from other races, and 1.0% from two or more races. Hispanic or Latino of any race were 1.1% of the population.

There were 1,070 households, out of which 26.8% had children under the age of 18 living with them, 46.7% were married couples living together, 16.3% had a female householder with no husband present, and 32.3% were non-families. 29.9% of all households were made up of individuals, and 15.9% had someone living alone who was 65 years of age or older. The average household size was 2.41 and the average family size was 3.00.

In the town, the population was spread out, with 22.3% under the age of 18, 8.4% from 18 to 24, 25.9% from 25 to 44, 24.3% from 45 to 64, and 19.0% who were 65 years of age or older. The median age was 40 years. For every 100 females, there were 88.5 males. For every 100 females age 18 and over, there were 84.1 males.

The median income for a household in the town was $31,494, and the median income for a family was $41,367. Males had a median income of $30,592 versus $22,440 for females. The per capita income for the town was $16,856. About 10.4% of families and 15.3% of the population were below the poverty line, including 18.9% of those under age 18 and 22.6% of those age 65 or over.

Education
Pacolet has a lending library, a branch of the Spartanburg County Public Library.

Notable people
George Banks (1938-1985), baseball player
Robert Henry Best (April 15, 1896 – December 16, 1952) was an American broadcaster of Nazi propaganda during World War II.  He was convicted of treason in 1948 and sentenced to life imprisonment.  Best died in federal prison in Missouri.  He is buried beside his sister Louise Best at the Pacolet Methodist Church cemetery.
C. Bruce Littlejohn (July 22, 1913 – April 21, 2007), former Chief Justice of the South Carolina Supreme Court and author on South Carolina legal history, is buried in the Pacolet First Baptist Church cemetery.
Ernie White(1916-1974), baseball player

References

External links
 Town website

Towns in Spartanburg County, South Carolina
Towns in South Carolina